The Anglican Diocese of Kabba is one of eleven within the Anglican Province of Lokoja, itself one of 14 provinces within the Church of Nigeria. The current bishop is Steven Akobe, who was consecrated a bishop on 12 September 2010 at St Peter's Cathedral, Asaba.

Notes

Dioceses of the Province of Lokoja
Church of Nigeria dioceses